The Varsity Polo Match is an annual polo match between the Oxford University Polo Club and the Cambridge University Polo Club, played between teams of four players. Historically it was known as the inter-University Challenge Cup or inter-Varsity polo match. It is also known as the Oxford-Cambridge Polo Match or by a title that includes the name of its current sponsor (1982 Champagne Taittinger University matches; 1984 Krug Champagne Varsity Polo; from 2010 to 2014, the Jack Wills Varsity Polo, and from 2016 onwards the La Martina Varsity).  Members of both teams are traditionally known as Blues, with Oxford in dark blue and Cambridge in light blue.

The polo match is held annually, attracting up to 5000 spectators. It usually takes place at the beginning of June at Guards Polo Club. The Varsity Match was most recently contested in June 2022, and was won by Oxford by a margin of 8–2. As of 2022 Oxford has won the match 66 times and Cambridge 57 times.

History
Historically speaking, the Varsity Polo Match is the second oldest continuing polo match with the inter-regimental match proceeding it by only 7 years. The first Varsity match was played in 1878. The event has been held annually with the exceptions of the two World Wars as well as 1894, 1900, 1960–61 and 1963.  The match was originally played at Hurlingham Club, but moved to Woolmers Park as well as to Cowdray Park after World War II. From 1962 onwards, the venue for the match was decided annually, with the choice alternating with each university. Since 1994, the Varsity Match is played at Guards Polo Club.
The Match is played for a Challenge Cup presented by the Hurlingham Club in 1920.

Competitors
The match format is extremely unusual as it is traditionally not handicapped. Teams are also mixed which is a rare opportunity amongst the Blues sports of both universities. The original conditions are:

No player eligible who has been a member of his University for more than four years, or who has not been in residence during the term in which the match takes place. Instituted in 1878. Played generally at Hurlingham, in June. (Modern Polo, 1896)
No player eligible who has been a member of his University for more than four years, or who has not been in residence during the term in which the match takes place. The Cup shall be held by the winning University in each year until May 1st in the succeeding year, when it shall be returned to The Hurlingham Club. Play – 6 periods.
(The Polo Yearbook 1939)

Old Blues Match
The main varsity match is preceded by a match between the two Old Blues teams. This match has a similar tradition to the Varsity Match as it is held annually and its records go back to 1879 (with major gaps in the statistic). It was known by the title Old Oxonians vs Old Cantabs. In the past, both teams helped to promote British polo not just on Varsity Day but also in other tournaments and events and were seen as one of the strongest British polo teams until World War II brought an end to that.

Results and statistics 
A selection of the more frequently cited statistics includes:

 Number of wins: Oxford, 66; Cambridge, 57 
 Most consecutive victories: Oxford, 8 (1966–73)
 Match record: Oxford, 2016 winning 19 – 0

Full results by year

a.  At the call of time the score was still one goal all, so the teams met again at Hurlingham a few days later, when Cambridge won by 3 goals to 2.

Notable players
 Walter Long, 1st Viscount Long, Oxford (1854–1924)
 Thomas Hitchcock Sr., Oxford (1860–1941)
 Douglas Haig, 1st Earl Haig, Oxford (1861–1928)
 Walter Buckmaster, Cambridge (1872–1942)
 Frederick Freake, Cambridge (1876–50)
 Patteson Womersley Nickalls, Oxford (1877–1946)
 Devereux Milburn, Oxford (1881–1942)
 Harold Pearson, 2nd Viscount Cowdray, Oxford (1882–1933)
 John Wodehouse, 3rd Earl of Kimberley, Cambridge (1883–1941)
 Prince Henry, Duke of Gloucester, Cambridge (1900–1970)
 Weetman Pearson, 3rd Viscount Cowdray, Oxford (1910–1995)
 George Haig, 2nd Earl Haig, Oxford (1918–2009)
 Claire Tomlinson, Oxford (1944-2022)
 Charles, Prince of Wales, Cambridge (b. 1948)
 Redmond Watt, Oxford (b. 1950)
 Lanto Sheridan, Oxford (b. 1988)

References

External links
 Oxford University Polo Club
 Cambridge University Polo Club

Sport at the University of Cambridge
Sport at the University of Oxford
Polo
Recurring sporting events established in 1878
1878 establishments in England
Polo in the United Kingdom
Polo competitions in the United Kingdom